Želenice is name of several locations in the Czech Republic:
Želenice (Kladno District)
Želenice (Most District)